Watford Football Club are an association football team from the county of Hertfordshire, England. Waford has played in the Championship since being relegated from the Premier League in 2006–07. The club finished the season in 13th position out of 24 Championship teams. The club went through four managers during the season.

Background, review and events

The 2008–09 season was their second consecutive one in the Football League Championship, following relegation from the Premier League in 2006–07.

They reached the fifth round of both the League Cup and FA Cup, where they were eliminated by Premier League sides Tottenham Hotspur and Chelsea respectively. Both teams went on to reach the finals of the corresponding competitions, with Chelsea going on to win the 2009 FA Cup Final.

Off the pitch, there were a series of personnel changes through the course of the season. Chairman Graham Simpson and chief executive Mark Ashton resigned, and were replaced by Jimmy Russo and Julian Winter respectively. Following a decline in form throughout 2008, manager Aidy Boothroyd left the club by mutual consent, and was replaced by Brendan Rodgers. In turn, Rodgers controversially left the club a few weeks after the last game of the season, having previously suggested that rumours linking him to Reading were "questioning his integrity". His replacement was first team coach and former player Malky Mackay.

The season is perhaps best remembered for the "ghost goal" incident, which occurred in a league match against Reading on 20 September 2008. Following a corner from Reading player Stephen Hunt, John Eustace kicked the ball across the line, level with the six-yard box. Initially, linesman Nigel Bannister seemed to signal for a goal kick, and players from both sides ran away from the penalty area, waiting for goalkeeper Scott Loach to take it. However, Bannister walked over to referee Stuart Attwell, and after a brief discussion, Attwell awarded Reading a goal. The match eventually finished 2–2. The match also marked Loach's debut; the "ghost goal" was the first goal he conceded in his Watford career.

Match results

League Championship

League results

Results summary

Final league table

FA Cup

League Cup

Player information

First-team squad
Squad at end of season

Left club during season

Squad, appearances and goals

Bookings

References

Match reports

Other references

External links
Watford Football Club official site
The Football League official site

Watford
Watford F.C. seasons